Cunningham Glacier is a tributary glacier in the Queen Maud Mountains, flowing northeast to enter Canyon Glacier  north of Gray Peak. It was named by the Advisory Committee on Antarctic Names for Willard E. Cunningham, Jr., a cook at McMurdo Station, winter 1960, and at South Pole Station, winter 1963.

References 

Glaciers of Dufek Coast